Epioecia is a genus of moths of the family Noctuidae.  Its type species is Epioecia kohleriana.

References
Natural History Museum Lepidoptera genus database

Hadeninae